Mike Clifford, (born 5th November 1943), is an American singer, songwriter and actor. He is known for his 1962 pop hit, "Close To Cathy", which reached number 12 on the Billboard Hot 100.

Early life
Mike Clifford was born in Los Angeles, California, United States. His father, Cal Clifford, was a professional trumpeter, who took him to many of his engagements. Mike soon developed an interest in music and began taking voice lessons. While in school, Cliiford began to entertain at school and community functions, and by the age of 16 was performing at local nightclubs in Los Angeles. After singing for just a short time period, Clifford signed with Liberty Records in 1959. He recorded his first single that year, titled "Should I". The song was written and produced by Mark McIntyre and featured additional vocals from Patience and Prudence and Eddie Cochran on guitar.

Clifford met Helen Noga through an introduction by a friend, and she agreed to become his personal manager after hearing him sing. Helen Noga and her husband John managed the career of Johnny Mathis, and were able to get Clifford signed to Columbia Records. Later, Noga brought Clifford to meet Ed Sullivan who was so impressed with Clifford's poise and stage presence that he booked him for his TV debut, the first of three appearances on The Ed Sullivan Show.

Initial success
Clifford's first taste of success came at age 18 when "Bombay", became a hit in Venezuela. He appeared on the state owned Venevision in his own TV special.

However, Clifford's recordings for Columbia received little buyer’s attention, and in July 1962, Clifford signed with United Artists Records. Jerry Leiber and Mike Stoller produced several songs for Clifford, including his biggest hit "Close To Cathy", written by Earl Shuman and composed by Bob Goodman. The song reached number 12 in September of that year, and stayed there for two weeks and remained on the charts for 12 weeks. On December 29, 1962, "What To Do With Laurie" entered the Billboard Hot 100 and peaked at number No. 67. "One Boy Too Late" entered the Billboard Hot 100 on May 11, 1963 and was to be his last nationally charted record. He subsequently, had several songs that were regional hits in the U.S.

He had hit records in Argentina, Brazil, Canada, Germany as well as "It Had Better Be Tonight" in Chile, "See You In September" in the Philippines, and "How To Murder Your Wife" in Japan.

In 1965, United Artists released Clifford's debut album, For The Love Of Mike, which was reviewed and a spotlight pick in the February 13, 1965 issue of Billboard.

Clifford appeared in the films Village of the Giants in 1965, and also sang the love theme of the film, The Glass Sphinx in 1967, the title song to Dagmar's Hot Pants, "You Say Love" in 1971, The love theme for the film Necromancy , "The Morning After" in 1972, and for The Lord Of The Rings in 1978. In the 1978 film Sextette, Clifford sang "Love Will Keep Us Together", with Mae West, while actor Timothy Dalton lip synched the words.

Tours
Clifford toured over one hundred cities during 1964 and 1965, with the Dick Clark Caravan of Stars and perform in Canada, France, Puerto Rico, Hawaii, and Mexico. He did commercials for Black Cow and Slowpoke suckers, Ortho Mattress and MJB coffee. American International Pictures purchased cartoon films from Japan and had the dialogue and songs translated into English. Clifford recorded the Guy Hemric-produced song "Rose Color Sky" and another song for the soundtracks. They were released to movie theaters and television.

In 1967, Clifford opened a two-week engagement at the Ye Little Club in Beverly Hills, California. One of the celebrities who came to his opening night was Judy Garland. Clifford sang "My Best Girl" from Mame to her, after which she insisted on throwing him an opening night party.

The 1970s also saw Clifford play the dual role of Teen Angel and Johnny Casino in the first national tour of the Broadway musical, Grease, that also starred John Travolta.

In 1975, he appeared with the operatic tenor Jan Peerce in the Broadway production of Fiddler On the Roof as Motel, the timid tailor.

In 1976, he traveled to Paris, France, to co-star with Line Renaud in a new two-hour extravaganza entitled Paris Line at the Casino de Paris. A cast album was also recorded in Paris of the show where Clifford was featured on several solos.

He also appeared and sang on American Bandstand and also Where the Action Is (ABC-TV).  He was a favorite on Baltimore's Buddy Deane Show (1962).

Songs
Clifford recorded the songs "Pretty Little Girl in the Yellow Dress" from the Universal Pictures The Last Sunset in 1961, "Look in Any Window" from the Allied Artists picture Look in Any Window in 1961, "Joanna" from the TV production Peter Gunn in 1961, "At Last" for the United Artist release The Last Time I Saw Archie in 1961, "It Had Better Be Tonight" from the Mirisch-G&E Production The Pink Panther in 1963,  "Barbara’s Theme" from the motion picture Diary Of A Bachelor in 1964, "How to Murder Your Wife" and "Here's To My Lover" from the motion picture How To Murder Your Wife in 1965, "Magic Night" for the movie soundtrack Mondo Hollywood in 1967, "It’s a Dream Away" for the American International Pictures film The Glass Sphinx in 1967, "The Golden Breed" for the Hollywood International Production movie The Golden Breed in 1968, "Mary Jane", the title song for the American International motion picture Mary Jane in 1968 the theme from the motion picture, Those Fantastic Flying Fools, "You Say Love"  for the Trans-American film Dagmar's Hot Pants Inc. in 1971, "The Morning After" for the Cinerama-Zenith International Production, and the theme for Necromancy in 1972.

In the early 1970s, Clifford and Lu Ann Simms were called to record a new version of the Beach Party album music, after Frankie and Annette recorded the final versions for the films. These recordings were released as Summer Fun by the Columbia House mail order division as a bonus gift.

Clifford continues to have a nightclub and concert career, that began on his 18th birthday at the Elegante Club, Brooklyn, New York co-starring with Totie Fields.

He has toured with his singing partner, Sandy Zacky. The two released a collaborative album in 2007, titled Love Is Everything. In 2010, Clifford recorded a brand new mp3 release, "Mack The Knife", on the Hired Gun Records label.

In 2015, Clifford traveled to Long Island, New York for the annual doo-wop show, where he headlined along with Jimmy Clanton, Johnny Tillotson, and Chuck Jackson, among others. In 2017, Clifford released his first video that he co-produced, directed, and starred in "What A Wonderful World" dance mix version. He also recorded a ballad version of the song with just piano accompaniment by Ben DiTosti. Both songs were made available for download. In late 2017, Clifford produced his second music video, a remake of the Nat King Cole's "The Christmas Song." This new version was arranged by Ben DiTosti and co-produced by Maurice Gainen for Clifford's new label, Grover Stew Music.

In 2018, Clifford recorded a new version of "Will You Love Me Tomorrow," featuring Ben DiTosti on piano, with full orchestra arranged and produced by Maurice Gainen and Clifford.  He then proceeded to create a new video for this song, co-produced by Maurice Gainen.  The audio version achieved Top Ten status on the Reverb Nation LA Jazz Music Chart.

On the 50th anniversary of her death, Clifford created a tribute to Judy Garland, with the release of a new recording and video of "Over The Rainbow".

In late 2019, Clifford reunited with his singing partner Sandy Zacky in a tribute to the late Doris Day. They recorded a new version of her first hit song "Sentimental Journey." A new video was also produced by DiTosti, Gainen, and Clifford. Released in late November, within six weeks "Sentimental Journey" achieved top five status on the Reverb Nation LA Jazz Music Chart and, as of January 2020, the song was still listed in the top 10.

In the fall of 2021, Mike released a new video and audio recording of a Livingston and Evans song, "His Own Little Island." This jazzy bossa nova production hit the Reverb Nation LA Jazz Chart Top Ten in less than one week of release. Positive reaction was received from fans and friends alike.

In December 2021, Mike released a new recording of the classic "Ave Maria" sung in Latin, arranged by Ben DiTosti and produced by Maurice Gainen. This holiday production has been called beautiful, almost operatic, and fantastic by fans and critics.

References

External links

Mike Clifford's comprehensive discography

1943 births
Living people
American singer-songwriters
American male singer-songwriters
American male actors